Marco Morabito is an Italian producer and editor, best known for producing the film Call Me by Your Name, for which he was co-nominated for the Academy Award for Best Picture at the 90th Academy Awards.

Filmography
Producer
 2019: The Staggering Girl (short film) (producer)
 2018: Suspiria (producer) 
 2017: Call Me by Your Name (producer) 
 2015: A Bigger Splash (executive producer) 
 2015: Antonia. (producer) 
 2012: The Landlords (producer) 
 2010: Diarchy (Short) (producer) 
 2009: I Am Love (producer) 
 2004: Arto Lindsay Perdoa a Beleza (The Love Factory Series) (Documentary short) (producer) 
 2004: Cuoco contadino (Documentary) (producer) 
 2002: Tilda Swinton: The Love Factory (Documentary short) (producer)
Editor
 2007: Part deux (Short) 
 2005: Being Claudia Cardinale (TV Movie documentary) 
 2005: Briciole (TV Movie) 
 2004: Cuoco contadino (Documentary) 
 2004: Il produttore (Short) 
 2003: Lotus (Video documentary) 
Cinematographer 
 2001: Another World Is Possible (Documentary)

References

External links
 Marco Morabito at Mubi 
 

Living people
Italian film producers
Italian screenwriters
Italian male screenwriters
Year of birth missing (living people)